Following is a list of destinations served by Sudan Airways, . Terminated destinations are also shown.

References

Lists of airline destinations